The 1978 Wolverhampton Metropolitan Borough Council election for the City of Wolverhampton Council was held on Thursday 4 May.

Following the elections no single party had overall control of Wolverhampton Metropolitan Borough Council, the WAR candidates voted with Labour at the mayor making a few weeks later but control passed to the Conservative group following the February 1979 Low Hill by election when the Conservatives gained a seat from Labour.

The 1978 election is notable in that two future Wolverhampton Members of Parliament, Dennis Turner (Bilston East) and Ken Purchase (Eastfield) were both elected to the council.

A vacant seat in St Peters meant two seats were contested in that ward.

The composition of the council prior to the election was:

Labour 33
Conservative 24
Wolverhampton Association of Ratepayers 2
Vacancy 1

The composition of the council following the election was:

Labour 29
Conservative 29
Wolverhampton Association of Ratepayers 2

Election results

External links

1978
1978 English local elections
1970s in the West Midlands (county)